José Antonio de la Sagra Fermín (born 1 April 1976), sometimes known simply as Pepe de la Sagra or Dela, is a Spanish football manager and former player who played as a midfielder. He is the current second manager of Lleida Esportiu.

Playing career
As a player, he is a product of the Atlético Madrid school. His good performances at Atlético B, prompted him to be an under-19 international with Spain and form part of the Atlético squad for the "doblete" in the 1995–96 season in which he won La Liga and Copa del Rey. De la Sagra was the number 16 of that great team trained by Radomir Antić with players like Simeone, Kiko, Molina, Penev, Pantić or Caminero.

He continued his progress as a professional at Barcelona B, and from there he made the leap to leagues in Portugal, Mexico and France. Upon his return to Spain, he settled in the province of Alicante, where he played in the fourth and fifth levels in teams from this province.

Coaching career
As a sporting director, he coordinated the different Mutxamel CF teams and subsequently trained at the fourth level, standing out at CD Roda, the Villarreal CF factory. In June, July and August 2019 he signed as head coach of Akonangui FC of Equatorial Guinea to play the qualifying round of the CAF Confederation Cup, where he was eliminated by Ashanti Gold of Ghana. The CD Roda allowed him to spend three months directing Equatorial Guinea team.

In the 2020–21 season he signs for Hércules U19, and his good work makes him finish the season at Hércules B on the fourth level where he manages to escape relegation. With the arrival of Sergio Mora to the bench of the Hércules CF first team, De la Sagra becomes the second manager in the 2021–22 season on Segunda RFEF and director of the football farm of the Alicante-based club.

De la Sagra signed in the 2022–23 season as assistant coach to Pere Martí at Lleida Esportiu.

References

External links
 Hércules official profile 
 

1976 births
Living people
Footballers from Castilla–La Mancha
Spanish footballers
Association football midfielders
La Liga players
Segunda División players
Segunda División B players
Tercera División players
Divisiones Regionales de Fútbol players
Atlético Madrid B players
Atlético Madrid footballers
FC Barcelona Atlètic players
Boavista F.C. players
S.C. Beira-Mar players
Atlante F.C. footballers
Irapuato F.C. footballers
CP Cacereño players
OGC Nice players
CD Dénia footballers
Yeclano CF players
CD Eldense footballers
CD Villarrobledo players
Spain youth international footballers
Spanish expatriate footballers
Expatriate footballers in Portugal
Expatriate footballers in Mexico
Expatriate footballers in France
Primeira Liga players
Liga Portugal 2 players
Liga MX players
Liga Premier de México players
Ligue 2 players
Spanish football managers
Tercera División managers
Spanish expatriate football managers
Expatriate football managers in Equatorial Guinea
Spanish expatriate sportspeople in Equatorial Guinea